O.F.T.B. (an abbreviation of Operation From The Bottom) was an American hip hop group from the Watts district of Los Angeles, California. The group O.F.T.B. consisted of three founding actual gang members Kevin "Flipside" White, Sammy "Bust Stop" Williams, and Ronald "Low M.B." Watkins, who grew up in Nickerson Gardens Project, which is home to the notorious gang Bounty Hunter Bloods. They were signed to Big Beat Records where they released their debut album Straight Up Watts in 1992 with the hit single "Slangin' Dope".

History
The trio, Flipside, Low M.B., and Bus Stop released Straight Up Watts album on the Atlantic-backed Big Beat Records in 1992. their first single, "Slangin' Dope", received heavy rotation on The Box, which was a local TV channel for Los Angeles that only played requested music videos. Under the guidance of DJ Quik and 2nd II None's manager "Greedy" Greg, the group was soon picked up by Death Row Records. O.F.T.B. appeared on the platinum-selling, Suge Knight / Dr. Dre-produced soundtrack for Above The Rim, as well as the soundtrack for Murder Was The Case.

Death Row Records
The trio appeared on the platinum-selling, Suge Knight and Death Row-produced soundtrack for the 1994 film Above the Rim with tracks, such as "Crack Em" (produced by DJ Quik and Murder Was The Case "Hot One") as well as on the soundtrack for 1997 film Gridlock'd with track "Body & Soul". O.F.T.B. also appeared the Gang Related soundtrack with "Keep Your Eyez Open" in 1997.

With Tupac Shakur
Tupac Shakur worked with O.F.T.B. on several tracks such as "The Struggle Continuez", "Worldwide (Time After Time)" and the original version "Better Dayz". The remake of Better Dayz was released after the death of 2Pac on his multi-platinum double-album (Better Dayz). They also made tribute song dedicated to 2Pac and Yaki Kadafi called "Still A Mystery" featuring The Outlawz and Kurupt. 2Pac also mention them in his hit single "To Live And Die In L.A." from The Don Killuminati: The 7 Day Theory In 2013, they digitally released Hostile Environment through Tha Payroll Entertainment.

Flipside's death
On September 23, 2013, Kevin "Flipside" White and a woman were shot in the 1600 block of East 114th Street in Watts, California. Flipside was rushed to a hospital and died from multiple gunshot wounds. Ten minutes later, a member of the P Jay Crips, Markice "Chiccen" Brider, was also shot to death. Kevin Phillips, a known member of the Grape Street Watts Crips was charged with two counts of murder and one count of attempted murder. A funeral service for Kevin White was held at Macedonia Baptist Church in Watts. The funeral had over 700 people in attendance, which included family, friends, and fans. Kevin White was longtime friends with Big Wy, of Damu Ridas and The Relativez, and a mentor to Jay Rock.

Discography

Studio albums
 1992: Straight Up Watts
 2007: Unearthed
 2009: The Missing D.R. Files
 2011: Damn Near Dead
 2013: Hostile Environment

Singles & EPs
 1992: "Slangin' Dope"
 1992: "Gimme 'Nother Hit "
 1994: "Hot One"
 1994: "Crack 'Em"
 1996: "Check Yo Hood"
 1997: "Body And Soul"
 1998: "Off The Ringer"
 1998: "In Too Deep"

Compilations
 1994: Above the Rim soundtrack (Various)
 1994: Murder Was the Case soundtrack (Various)
 1996: Christmas on Death Row (With Death Row Records)
 1996: Gridlock'd soundtrack (Various)
 1997: Gang Related soundtrack (Various)
 1998: Return Of The West
 2007: Archives soundtrack (Various)
 2009: The Ultimate Death Row Collection (Various)

Videography

Music videos

See also
Crime in Los Angeles

References

External links
 Tha Payroll Entertainment
 O.F.T.B at AllMusic
 
 O.F.T.B. on Myspace

Hip hop groups from California
Bloods
Death Row Records artists
Gangsta rap groups
Musical groups established in 1990
Musical groups from Los Angeles
1990 establishments in California